Duane Lewis Wilson (June 29, 1934 – November 9, 2021) was an American professional baseball player.

A pitcher, he appeared in two games in Major League Baseball for the Boston Red Sox during the 1958 season.

Wilson signed with the Red Sox in 1952 and was in his seventh season in the club's farm system when he was recalled on July 3, 1958. In two games, both starts, Wilson posted a 5.68 ERA in 6 innings pitched, giving up five runs (four earned) on 10 hits and seven walks while striking out three. He did not have a decision.

In his first start, on July 3 against the Baltimore Orioles, Wilson allowed only one unearned run in six full innings, although he surrendered eight hits and walked five. Baltimore won 7–5 in 15 innings. 

However, in his second appearance nine days later, Wilson was treated roughly by the Chicago White Sox, getting only one out in the first inning of a 13–5 loss (charged to his successor on the Boston mound, Mike Fornieles) and surrendering four earned runs on two hits and two bases on balls.

Wilson then returned to minor league baseball for the remainder of his career. He left baseball after the 1959 season.

Wilson died in Wichita on November 9, 2021, at the age of 87.

References

External links

1934 births
2021 deaths
Albany Senators players
Baseball players from Wichita, Kansas
Boston Red Sox players
Greensboro Patriots players
High Point-Thomasville Hi-Toms players
Louisville Colonels (minor league) players
Major League Baseball pitchers
Memphis Chickasaws players
Minneapolis Millers (baseball) players
Oklahoma City Indians players